Nye Troms is a local newspaper published in Målselv, Norway.

References

External links
www.nye-troms.no

Målselv
Newspapers published in Norway
Norwegian-language newspapers
Publications with year of establishment missing